The Foundation for the Preservation and Publication of Sacred Defense Works and Values is one of the institutions of the Islamic Republic of Iran with the aim of preserving the relics and disseminating the values of the Sacred Defense (Iran-Iraq war known by Iranians as the "Sacred Defence" or "Holy Defense") and promoting the culture of resistance, self-sacrifice, jihad and martyrdom. It was established by order of the Supreme Leader of Iran at the end of Iran-Iraq war in October 1990. This foundation is headed by Sardar Bahman Kargar and its parent department is General Staff of the Armed Forces of the Islamic Republic of Iran.

Main tasks
 Organizing travels to the areas left by the Iran–Iraq war under caravans called Rahian-e Noor
 Participate in the construction of Iran–Iraq war museums in the cities of Iran
 Cooperation in performing funeral ceremonies and honoring the martyrs in all over Iran
 Holding literary and artistic festivals with the theme of Iran–Iraq war

Mission
The main mission of the "Foundation for the Preservation and Publication of Sacred Defense Works and Values" is preserving the works and disseminating the moral and spiritual values created during Iran–Iraq War and promoting the culture of resistance, self-sacrifice, jihad and martyrdom.

Objectives
The purpose of establishing the "Foundation for the Preservation and Publication of Sacred Defense Works and Values" is to protect and registration of the epics formed during Iran–Iraq War and its effects on cultural, political, social, economic and military fields and prevent the destruction and distortion or oblivion of them.

Duties
Playing a staff role (including policy-making, general guidance, coordination, monitoring and support) in preserving the cultural relics of jihad and Iran–Iraq War and entrusting executive tasks to interested organizations based on the following general tasks:

 A) Researching, identifying, collecting, preserving, compiling written and unwritten cultural, historical, artistic and scientific works and carrying out matters related to preserving the works and disseminating the values of the Iran–Iraq War in the general war policy received from Khatam-al Anbiya Central Headquarters.
 B) Selection, possession, preservation and use of physical works, including weapons, trophies, places, lands and positions, and registration of national works.
 C) Record and compile the cultural and epic foundations of the Iran–Iraq War (sacred defense) in order to transmit them to future generations and other nations.
 D) Publication of the encyclopedia of the Iran–Iraq War, history of the imposed war, the war calendar, geography of the war, planning and coordination for sending the caravans to war zones called Rahian-e Noor, pursuing the establishment of museums, cultural centers and monuments of the Iran–Iraq War (Holy Defense), festivals and memorials; In order to revive the spirit of chivalry in the Muslims and take advantage of the blessings and experiences of the Iran–Iraq War in the future with the cooperation and participation of the Armed Forces of the Islamic Republic of Iran and other relevant executive organizations.
 E) Establishing coordination in preserving the relics of sacred defense and protecting them with the best scientific methods and preventing dispersion and depreciation.
 F) Formation of technical and specialized committees, as the case may be, with the participation of relevant institutions and organizations in the field of preserving the works and values of the sacred defense and determining the quality of its exploitation.
 G) Proper utilization of the capabilities of all organizations, institutions of veterans, armed forces and cultural institutions in order to disseminate the values of Iran–Iraq War (sacred defense) and reflect its achievements in all fields.
 H) Utilizing the achievements of liberation movements, the culture of resistance and the literature of stability of other nations to develop the culture of self-sacrifice and martyrdom and endurance against global arrogance.
 I) Conducting scientific-applied research on the collection and optimal use of the works and values of the Iran–Iraq War (sacred defense) and presenting the necessary plans for the optimal protection of the works of the Iran–Iraq War (sacred defense).
 J) Provide the necessary grounds for introducing the cultural works and values of jihad and Iran–Iraq War (holy defense) through audio, video, press and electronic media and to support cultural and artistic programs related to the promotion of the culture of resistance and self-sacrifice, jihad and martyrdom especially among the younger generation, and support for research related to these topics.

See also
 Foundation of Martyrs and Veterans Affairs
 15 Khordad Foundation
 Mostazafan Foundation
 Housing Foundation of Islamic Revolution

References

External links
 Picture report: Foundation for Preservation of Sacred Defense Values meeting
 QUALITATIVE AND QUANTITATIVE EVALUATION OF PRODUCTIONS OF SACRED DEFENSE THEATRE IN IRAN
 31 plays on Iran-Iraq war published - Tehran Times
 Picture report: National Conference on Foundation for Preserving Sacred Defense Works
 We need more Sacred Defense books: official

Revolutionary institutions of the Islamic Republic of Iran
Foundations based in Iran
General Staff of the Armed Forces of the Islamic Republic of Iran
Government agencies of Iran
1990 establishments in Iran